This page provides supplementary chemical data on antimony trioxide.

Also known as Sb2O3. It has a melting point of 656 °C, and a boiling point of 1550 °C.  It is a Cubic Crystal Structure with a
density of 5.2G/Cm3

Material Safety Data Sheet  
MSDS from SIRI

Structure and properties

Thermodynamic properties

Spectral data

References 

Chemical data pages
Chemical data pages cleanup